The Japanese submarine chaser CH-2 was a  of the Imperial Japanese Navy during World War II. Built by Mitsubishi Heavy Industries, Yokohama, she was completed on 25 March 1934.

Construction and design
CH-2 was laid down at the Ishikawajima Shipbuilding & Engineering Co. shipyard, Tokyo on 9 June 1933, was launched on 20 December 1933 and commissioned on 25 March 1934.

Displacement was  standard as built.

Anti-submarine armament consisted of two depth charge throwers with 36 depth charges carried, while anti-aircraft armament consisted of two 40 mm guns and two machine guns. Crew was 45 officers and men.

Service
On 12 March 1934, the  capsized during sea trials due to poor stability, Following this accident, it was realised that like many Japanese warships, the CH-1 class suffered from excessive topweight, and CH-2 was modified by adding ballast, increasing displacement to  standard and  full load.

World War II
CH-2s first mission of the war was on 7 December 1941 as part of Operation M, for the landings in the northern Philippines. She participated in the landings at Aparri on 10 December 1941.

CH-2 also supported Operation H, the invasion of Celebes in the Dutch East Indies along with numerous minesweepers, patrol boats, both of her sister ships, and the cruiser .

After the invasion of the Dutch East Indies was complete CH-2 took up convoy duties, escorting convoys of merchants and transports throughout the South Pacific and engaging in active anti-submarine patrols. On 27 March 1944 the sub chaser depth charged  in retaliation for that submarine's sinking of Nichinan Maru. The American submarine escaped without damage.

Although it was reported that the submarine, which turned out to be the Dutch , was sunk the attacker escaped without damage.

Fate
The American submarine observed some crew members abandoning ship in a lifeboat before departing the area. CH-2 was struck from the navy list on 10 August 1945.

References

 

1934 ships
Ships sunk by American submarines
Maritime incidents in June 1945
World War II shipwrecks in the Pacific Ocean
Ships built by IHI Corporation